The 1884 United States presidential election in Nevada took place on November 4, 1884, as part of the 1884 United States presidential election. Nevada voters chose three representatives, or electors, to the Electoral College, who voted for president and vice president.

Nevada was won by Secretary of State James G. Blaine (R-Maine), running with Senator John A. Logan, with 56.21% of the vote, against Grover Cleveland, the 28th governor of New York, (D–New York), running with the former governor of Indiana Thomas A. Hendricks, with 43.59% of the popular vote.

The Greenback and Anti-Monopoly Parties both chose major general and former governor of Massachusetts Benjamin Butler and Absolom M. West, an unseated Mississippi representative, received 0.20% of the vote for the scant 26 votes they received.

This is one of only three elections as of 2020 where a Democrat won the Presidency without carrying Nevada (the other instances were eight years later when Grover Cleveland won a second, non consecutive term as Populist James Weaver carried Nevada, and 1976, when Jimmy Carter won a narrow victory). Nevada has been a bellwether state for most of American history, and thus this is one of only eight total elections where Nevada has voted for a losing candidate out of the forty times Nevada has voted in presidential elections. The others are the aforementioned 1892 and 1976, along with Democrat Winfield Scott Hancock's victory four years prior in 1880; all three of Populist Democrat William Jennings Bryan's three runs in 1896, 1900, and 1908; and Hillary Clinton's victory in 2016.

Results

Results by county

See also
United States presidential elections in Nevada

Notes

References

Nevada
1884
1884 Nevada elections